Daramba is a Visayan term referring to paddling and fighting platforms mounted directly on the outriggers (katig) of traditional large trimaran warships (balangay) of the Philippines. They accommodated one or more rows on each side of commoner warriors (horo-han) with large leaf-shaped paddles (bugsay) during travel, naval warfare, and seasonal coastal raids (mangayaw). The paddlers were kept in rhythm by various chants and songs. The platforms for the horo-han are distinguished from the side-mounted fighting platforms (pagguray) of the warrior-nobility (the timawa and tumao), which were also built on the outriggers, in that the daramba was mounted on or near the water surface, while the pagguray was mounted above, closer to the hull.

See also
Outrigger boat
Lashed-lug boat
Balangay
Karakoa
Lanong
Bangka (boat)

References

Shipbuilding
Multihulls
Outrigger canoes
Visayan culture
Visayan history
Austronesian culture
Indigenous ships of the Philippines